Neferhetepes was the wife of the Ancient Egyptian king Userkaf, who was the first pharaoh of the Fifth Dynasty. She was the mother of king Sahure, Userkaf's successor, and she was most likely the mother of Meretnebty, Sahure's wife. Neferhetepes' most important titles were mother of the king of Upper and Lower Egypt and daughter of the god.

Neferhetepes was known for a long time from a reference in the tomb of the official Persen. His tomb is not far away from the pyramid of Userkaf, and therefore, there were some speculations about her identity and her relation to this king. However, several reliefs were found recently at the causeway of the pyramid belonging to king Sahure. Here, Neferhetepes is shown as mother of King Sahure, and she was therefore most likely the wife of Userkaf, Sahure's predecessor.

Neferhetepes was most likely buried in a small pyramid next to Userkaf's pyramid. She most likely lived until the end of Sahures' reign, and is therefore not the same person as the king's daughter Neferhetepes of the Fourth Dynasty.

References 

Queens consort of the Fifth Dynasty of Egypt
25th-century BC women